Urqu Jawira may refer to:

 Urqu Jawira (Aroma), a Bolivian river
 Urqu Jawira (Pedro Domingo Murillo), a Bolivian river